Fabil Sara (also Romanized as Fabīl Sarā; also known as Fabīl Sar) is a village in Rahimabad Rural District, Rahimabad District, Rudsar County, Gilan Province, Iran. At the 2006 census, its population was 158, in 41 families.

References 

Populated places in Rudsar County